Fiorenzo Aliverti (born 31 March 1957) is an Italian former professional racing cyclist. He rode in one edition of the Tour de France, three editions of the Giro d'Italia, and one edition of the Vuelta a España.

References

External links
 

1957 births
Living people
Italian male cyclists
Cyclists from the Province of Como
20th-century Italian people